Nokturnal Mortum are a Ukrainian black metal band from Kharkiv. They were one of the founders of the Ukrainian black metal scene and pioneers in the early National Socialist black metal ("NSBM") scene., which they have since grown distant from to focus on more folk metal themes.

History 
Nokturnal Mortum was originally formed as a death metal band called Suppuration in 1991, then turned to black metal and changed name to  Darkness but "had to change the name back in 1993/94 to Nocturnal Mortum because there already existed a band with that name in Western underground". They have stated this about the current name and spelling: "We changed a letter so that we wouldn't find a band with the same name again like it was the case with  Darkness". Nokturnal Mortum gained recognition in the underground Black Metal genre with the release of their debut album Goat Horns, which had two keyboardists play on the album (often on the same song) and for mixing traditional Ukrainian folk influences with BM. They focused heavily on atmospheric BM with themes common in classic nature-romanticism, often inspired by regional or local ancient folklore, mythology or journeys set in pagan landscapes. Early album art usually always depicted vast forests, swamps, sunsets, desolate mountains in wintery nights, and so on.

The band's first albums were released through The End Records and (as licence pressings) by Nuclear Blast, but the label and the band separated at the time of the album releases of NeChrist and Lunar Poetry, both releases suddenly containing political support to neo-Nazi and White supremacist causes. The band began to change from being in the more popular extreme metal scenes to becoming one of the leading groups in the National Socialist black metal scene in Eastern Europe. Varggoth himself said about the conflict with the label: "We had a contract with The End Records but it was broken. We have different points of view. They didn't like our policy, we didn't like the way they do business. They owe us some money. That was enough for a conflict."

Underground artist Igor Naumchuk (Lucifugum) had close ties with Nokturnal Mortum — who dedicated the album To the Gates of Blasphemous Fire to him — until all relations ceased due to ideological disagreements. Despite this, both bands are still likened to one another.

In autumn of 2014, band frontman Knjaz Varggoth published a statement declaring that he and Nokturnal Mortum had begun to distance themselves from politics in order to avoid rumors concerning his personal views and band ideology; however, the band played live at the Neo-Nazi festival Asgardsrei in December 2016 and 2018, and have played at several other alt-right festivals since. Despite this shift in music, streaming services such as Spotify has retroactively blacklisted the band.

Members

Current 
 Knjaz Varggoth – lead vocals, guitars, keyboards, folk instruments (1994–present), bass (1999)
 Wortherax – guitars (1994–1996, 2020-present)
 Karpath – bass (2020-present), guitars (1996-1999)
 Surm – keyboards (2018-present)
 Kubrakh – drums (2020-present)

Former 
 Xaarquath – bass (1994-2002)
 Munruthel – drums (1994-2000, 2000-2003)
 Sataroth – keyboards (1994-2000, 2000-2003)
 Saturious – keyboards, folk instruments, percussion (1996-2014), bass (2012-2014)
 Vrolok – guitars (2000-2002), bass (2002-2011)
 Alzeth – guitars (2002-2007)
 K – keyboards (2003-2004)
 Odalv – drums (2003-2009)
 Astargh – guitars (2007-2011)
 Bairoth – drums (2009-2020)
 Aywar – guitars (2012-2014)
 Rutnar – bass (2014-2020)
 Jurgis – guitars, backing vocals (2014-2019)
 Hyozt – keyboards (2017-2018)

Controversies and Nazi ideology 
Initially, the band described their music as "lunar black metal". On their 1996 demo Lunar Poetry the band advocated for the killing of Christians, the destruction of churches, and Slavic paganism, along with describing Jesus as a "crucified hippie". Later, when releasing their EP Marble Moon and also the Nechrist and Lunar Poetry albums, they included anti-Semitic lyrics with neo-Nazi and white supremacy messages and imagery.

As the more popular non-political black metal scene (including many shops and concert events) began distancing themselves from their ideology, the band instead became prominent in the early Eastern European National Socialist black metal scene, and is today often considered as one of the groups that shaped the Slavic subcultural NSBM movement. They also began using swastikas in their logo, on albums, during shows, and praising the Third Reich and the Holocaust openly in various side-projects. Knjaz Varggoth, in one of several side projects, also voiced support for the so-called "racial holy war" idea. Nokturnal Mortum's album Нехристь (Nechrist) features a song called "The Call of Aryan Spirit", which includes anti-Semitic lyrics and glorified pogroms. The album's original release included a swastika design consisting of four AK-47's.

In interviews, appearances, merchandise and on their website, the band showcased neo-Nazi opinions but their music style itself was described as "pagan black metal". Statements and texts show neo-neo-völkisch as well as neo-paganist ideas, and a tendency to ariosophy.

In 2008, the band's vocalist and guitarist, Knjaz Varggoth, claimed that he had no interest in political tendencies and that he had, "never viewed Nokturnal Mortum as a political band". In 2014 the group again stated that the band had severed ties with NSBM ideologies and political themes, but at the same time and in the following years, they remained active in white supremacist circles and has played live at neo-Nazi and far right shows, in collaboration with the NSBM label "Militant Zone".

Discography

Albums 
 1997 – Goat Horns
 1998 – To the Gates of Blasphemous Fire
 1999 – Нехристь (NeChrist)
 2004 – Мировоззрение (Myrovozzrieniye, Worldview)
 2005 – Weltanschauung (Worldview)
 2009 – Голос сталі (Holos stali, The Voice of Steel)
 2017 – Істина (Istyna, Verity)
 2022 – До лунарної поезії (Do lunarnoyi poeziyi, To Lunar Poetry)

Live albums 
 2009 – Live in Katowice 
 2011 – Коловорот (Kolovorot)

EPs 
 1997 – Return of the Vampire Lord
 1997 – Marble Moon
 2003 – The Taste of Victory
 2017 – Orathania / Kolyada

Demos 
 1995 – Twilightfall
 1995 – Black Clouds Over Slavonic Lands
 1996 – Lunar Poetry

Splits 
 1996 – Veche (split Lucifugum)
 1997 – Path of the Wolf / Return of the Vampire Lord (split Lucifugum)
 2007 – Eastern Hammer (split Graveland, North, Темнозорь)
 2016 – The Spirit Never Dies (split Graveland)

Compilations 
 2001 – Return of the Vampire Lord / Marble Moon
 2004 – Eleven Years Among the Sheep
 2016 – 22 Years Among the Sheep

References 

Ukrainian black metal musical groups
Symphonic black metal musical groups
National Socialist black metal musical groups
Musical groups established in 1994
Musical quintets
Nuclear Blast artists
Ukrainian fascists
Ukrainian neo-Nazis
Musical groups from Kharkiv